The Seaman's Manslaughter Statute, codified at , criminalizes misconduct or negligence that result in deaths involving vessels (ships and boats) on waters in the jurisdiction of the United States.

The statute exposes three groups to criminal liability: 
 ship's officers, such as captains, engineers, and pilots;
 those having responsibility for the vessel's condition, such as owners, charterers, and inspectors; and
 corporate management. 
Unlike common law manslaughter, which requires a mens rea or mental state of gross negligence or heat of passion in absence of malice, this statute requires only simple negligence — a breach of duty to perform an act or omission in violation of a standard of care. The accident need not occur on a boat, and the threshold of criminal liability is lower than in standard manslaughter cases due to the reduced mens rea requirement.

History

Laws of this form date from steamboat accidents in the early 1800s. The first such legislation passed was the Steamboat Act of 1838, which established that any act of "misconduct, negligence, or inattention" by those responsible for steamboat operation or navigation which results in death shall deemed guilty of manslaughter. An early case in 1848 established a precedent that prosecutors would not need to prove any malicious intent. 

The Steamboat Act of 1852 amplified the earlier 1838 Act in response to continuing deaths and moved enforcement to the United States Department of the Treasury. "Public officers" and vessel owners were added to the list of those who could be held criminally liable in 1864. The Steamboat Inspection Service was created in 1871, which also explicitly made boiler inspectors subject to criminal liability.

The 1904 fire aboard  resulted in another Act in 1905 to make executive officers of corporate-owned steamboats criminally liable, and also added the term "neglect" to the list of actionable offenses. By this time, the criminal liabilities had been added to Section 5344 of the Revised Statutes of the United States.

Notable cases
Cases that established the negligence threshold include US v. Warner (1848), US v. Farnham (1853), US v. Collyer (1855), US v. Keller (1884), and US v. Van Schaick (1904). The last of these refers to the prosecution of Captain William Von Schaick, who was held responsible for the 1904 fire aboard General Slocum which killed 1,021.

The pilot of the Staten Island Ferry  lost consciousness while at the controls and crashed into a maintenance pier in October 2003, killing 11. Both the pilot and the city director of ferries were charged with seaman's manslaughter as a result; the director was found to be negligent by failing to enforce a requirement to have two pilots present during docking.

On March 11, 2015, the United States Court of Appeals for the Fifth Circuit published U.S. v. Kaluza, wherein it discussed the individuals included within the statute's "other person" provision. The court determined that two "well site leaders" working on the Deepwater Horizon at the time of the explosion were not "other person[s]." Using the ejusdem generis statutory interpretation rule, the Fifth Circuit reasoned that "well site leaders" did not have the same "common attribute" as vessel captains, engineers, and pilots (individuals who were involved in the "marine operations, maintenance, or navigation of the vessel").

See also
General Slocum disaster

References

External links
The Seaman's Manslaughter Statute - Workboat Magazine, Tim Akpinar

Admiralty law
United States admiralty law
Manslaughter in the United States
United States federal criminal legislation